Roman Igorevich Semyakin (born 28 August 1985) is a Russian former professional football player.

Club career
He made his Russian Football National League debut for FC Sokol Saratov on 6 July 2014 in a game against FC Yenisey Krasnoyarsk.

External links
 

1985 births
People from Volzhsky, Volgograd Oblast
Living people
Russian footballers
FC Energiya Volzhsky players
FC Rotor Volgograd players
FC Tyumen players
FC Sokol Saratov players
Association football defenders
FC Zenit-Izhevsk players
FC Dynamo Stavropol players
FC Oryol players
Sportspeople from Volgograd Oblast